Île-à-la-Crosse 192E is an Indian reserve of the English River First Nation in Saskatchewan. It is 5 miles east of Île-à-la-Crosse, on the east shore of Lac Île-à-la-Crosse, Township 74, Range 12, west of the Third Meridian.

References

Indian reserves in Saskatchewan
Division No. 18, Saskatchewan